Aortic aneurysm, familial abdominal 1 is a protein that in humans is encoded by the AAA1 gene.

References 

Genes on human chromosome 19